The men's 1500 metres at the 1969 European Athletics Championships was held in Athens, Greece, at Georgios Karaiskakis Stadium on 18 and 20 September 1969.

Medalists

Results

Final
20 September

Heats
18 September

Heat 1

Heat 2

Heat 3

Participation
According to an unofficial count, 22 athletes from 13 countries participated in the event.

 (2)
 (1)
 (1)
 (1)
 (2)
 (1)
 (2)
 (1)
 (3)
 (3)
 (1)
 (1)
 (3)

References

1500 metres
1500 metres at the European Athletics Championships